Barattarna, Parattarna, Paršatar, or Parshatatar was the name of a Hurrian king of Mitanni and is considered to have reigned, as per middle chronology between c. 1510 and 1490 BC by J. A. Belmonte-Marin quoting H. Klengel. 

Very few records of him are known as sources from Mitanni are rare. Most information we have about the kingdom, especially its early history and kings come from records outside of the state. Dates for the kings can be deduced by comparing the chronology of Mitanni and other states, especially ancient Egypt, at a later date and working back the figures. Information is found in the biography of Idrimi of Alalakh (or Alalah, which became the capital of Aleppo). Barattarna conquered the area and made Idrimi his vassal, Idrimi becoming king of Aleppo according to a treaty that also declared  Pilliya, the king of Kizzuwatna, his vassal. Mitanni in his time probably extended as far as Arrapha in the east, Terqa in the south, and Kizzuwatna in the West. Barattarna may have been the Mitannian king the Egyptian Pharaoh Thutmosis I met at the Euphrates River in a campaign early in his reign (around 1493). Information about his death is mentioned in a record from Nuzi dated to the death of king Barattarna, possibly around 1420, as per short chronology.

See also

Mitanni

References

15th-century BC deaths
15th-century BC rulers
Hurrian kings